This is a list of banana dishes and foods in which banana or plantain is used as a primary ingredient. A banana is an edible fruit produced by several kinds of large herbaceous flowering plants in the genus Musa. In some countries, bananas used for cooking may be called plantains. The fruit is variable in size, color and firmness, but is usually elongated and curved, with soft flesh rich in starch covered with a rind which may be green, yellow, red, purple, or brown when ripe. The fruits grow in clusters hanging from the top of the plant.

Banana dishes

  
 
 
  
 
 
  
 
 s
  
 
 
  
  
  
  
  
  
  
  Barongko – a Makassar steamed banana mashed with egg, coconut milk, sugar, and salt. It is wrapped in the banana leaf. 
  
  
  
  
  Es pisang ijo
  
 

  
 
  
  
  
  Kek pisang
  
  
  Kolak pisang
  Ledre – a Bojonegoro rolled banana crepe.
  

  

  
  
  
  
  
  
  
  
  
  Pisang epe – a Makassar grilled banana with toppings.
  Pisang plenet – a Semarang flattened banana with toppings.

See also

 Cooking plantain
 List of banana cultivars
 List of banana and plantain diseases
 List of fruit dishes
 Guineo - Green banana dishes from the Dominican Republic and Puerto Rico.
Twinkies, originally flavored with banana

References

 
Banana